John Heneage Kelsey (30 March 1867 – 21 October 1945) was an English cricketer. Kelsey was a right-handed batsman. He was born at Tunbridge Wells, Kent, and was educated at Repton School.

Kelsey made a single first-class appearance for Sussex against Worcestershire at the County Ground, Hove, in the 1902 County Championship. Sussex won the toss and elected to bat first, making 399/7 declared, during which Kelsey scored a single run before he was dismissed by George Simpson-Hayward. Worcestershire were then dismissed in their first-innings for 197, with Sussex forcing them to follow-on in their second-innings, with Worcestershire making 240 all out, which left Sussex with a target of 39 for victory. Sussex reached their target in their second-innings without losing any wickets. This was his only major appearance for Sussex.

Outside of cricket, he was a brewer. He died at Wadhurst, Sussex, on 21 October 1945.

References

External links
John Kelsey at ESPNcricinfo
John Kelsey at CricketArchive

1867 births
1945 deaths
People from Royal Tunbridge Wells
People educated at Repton School
English cricketers
Sussex cricketers